East Ujimqin Banner (Mongolian:    Jegün Ujumučin qosiɣu) is a banner in the northeast of the Inner Mongolia Autonomous Region, People's Republic of China. It is under the administration of Xilin Gol League.

Geography and climate

East Ujimqin features a cold semi-arid climate (Köppen BSk), marked by long, cold and very dry winters, hot, somewhat humid summers, and strong winds, especially in spring. Due to the aridity and elevation, diurnal temperature variation often exceeds  in spring, averaging  annually. With monthly percent possible sunshine ranging from 59% in July to 76% in February, sunshine is abundant year-round, with an annual total of 3,006 hours.

References
www.xzqh.org

External links

Banners of Inner Mongolia